Jakob Hlasek was the defending champion but lost in the first round to Martin Střelba.

Michael Chang won the final 6–2, 6–1, 6–1 against Guy Forget.

Seeds
A champion seed is indicated in bold text while text in italics indicates the round in which that seed was eliminated.

  John McEnroe (semifinals)
  Michael Chang (champion)
  Brad Gilbert (quarterfinals)
  Jimmy Connors (first round)
  Jakob Hlasek (first round)
  Kevin Curren (second round)
  Andrei Chesnokov (quarterfinals)
  Miloslav Mečíř (quarterfinals)

Draw

 NB: The Final was the best of 5 sets while all other rounds were the best of 3 sets.

Final

Section 1

Section 2

External links
 1989 Benson & Hedges Championships Draw

Wembley Championships
1989 Grand Prix (tennis)